Frogner is a borough of Oslo, Norway.

Frogner may also refer to other things in Norway:

Frogner, Akershus, a village
Frogner stadion, Oslo, a sports stadium
Frogner church, Oslo
Frogner manor, Oslo, a manor house